The Arizona Heat was a women's softball team based in Tucson, Arizona. From the 2004 season, it played as a member of National Pro Fastpitch. The team's home games were played at historic Hi Corbett Field.

Six of the players on the 2006 roster played college softball at the University of Arizona, and two more played for Arizona State University.

The team was suspended in February 2007 and ceased operations.

Notable players
 Jessica Mendoza – Outfield
 Danielle Henderson – Pitcher

References

Softball teams
Sports in Tucson, Arizona
2004 establishments in Arizona
Sports clubs established in 2004
2007 disestablishments in Arizona
Sports clubs disestablished in 2007
Defunct softball teams in the United States
Defunct National Pro Fastpitch teams
Defunct sports teams in Arizona
Women's sports in Arizona